Strandmøllen (Danish may refer to:

Buildings
 Strandmøllen, Rudersdal Municipality, a former paper mill north of Copenhagen
 Strandmøllen, Roskilde Municipalitym a watermill in Roskilde

Other
 A/S Strandmøllen, a company based in Strandmøllen